Viva is a Globosat channel. It was inaugurated on May 18, 2010, and belongs to the lineup of pay TV operators NET, SKY and Via Embratel. The channel features programs from TV Globo and the pay channel GNT on alternative schedules.

The focus of the station is the feminine and family. It exhibits miniseries, dubbed films, telenovelas, television series and variety programs. It also reruns Estrelas, Caldeirão do Huck, Mais Você and Malhação, all in alternative schedules. Presented is also going to repeat Laços de Família, O Dono do Mundo, Por Amor, Quatro por Quatro, O Rei do Gado, Mulheres de Areia, Riacho Doce, Mulher, A Casa das Sete Mulheres, Sai de Baixo, Toma Lá, Dá Cá, Chico Total and other Globo's programs. Previously available on GNT, Viva displays, also in alternative schedule, the program The Oprah Winfrey Show and Happy Hour, among other TV shows. Viva Televisao as it is also known bought the programme Sai De Baixo (meaning leave me alone) which stopped broadcasting in 2009.

Globosat
Television stations in Brazil
Television channels and stations established in 2010
Mass media in Rio de Janeiro (city)
2010 establishments in Brazil
Classic television networks